Dottie Sings Eddy is a studio album by American country music artist Dottie West. It was released in March 1969 on RCA Victor Records. The album was co-produced by Chet Atkins and Danny Davis. The project was a tribute to country artist, Eddy Arnold, whom West considered an inspiration in her career. West covered 11 tracks that were originally recorded by Arnold throughout his career.

Background and content
Dottie Sings Eddy was recorded as a tribute album to country artist Eddy Arnold. West considered Arnold to be an inspiration her own career. The album was co-produced by Chet Atkins and Danny Davis. The liner notes of the original album were also composed by Davis. In the liner notes, Davis called the project "a real winner" and said that the recording sessions were "very successful". The sessions took place in March 1969 at RCA Studio B in Nashville, Tennessee. The album was a collection of 11 tracks, all of which were previously recorded and made hits by Arnold. West covered songs from different eras of Arnold's career. Among the early recordings covered is "Cattle Call" (1955) and "I'll Hold You in My Heart (Till I Can Hold You in My Arms)" (1947). West also covered tunes Arnold later cut in the Nashville Sound style. Songs of this nature included "Make the World Go Away" (1965), "The Last Word in Lonesome Is Me" (1966) and "They Don't Make Them Like They Used To" (1968).

Release
Dottie Sings Eddy was originally released in May 1969 on RCA Victor Records, becoming West's twelfth studio recording issued. The album was first issued as a vinyl LP, featuring six songs on "side one" and five songs on "side two". In 2019, the album was reissued to digital retailers for streaming purposes by Sony Music Entertainment. The album's release was first announced in a July 1969 issue of Billboard Magazine, which was posted in alphabetical order under the magazine's "New Album Releases" page. The project did not spawn any known singles, becoming West's fourth studio record to do so.

Track listing

Original vinyl version

Digital version

Personnel
All credits are adapted from the liner notes of Dottie Sings Eddy.

Musical personnel
 Harold Bradley – guitar
 Buddy Harman – drums
 Grady Martin – guitar
 Bob Moore – bass
 Ferrell Morris – vibes
 The Nashville Edition – background vocals
 Jerry Reed – guitar
 Hargus "Pig" Robbins – piano
 Bill West – steel guitar
 Dottie West – lead vocals

Technical personnel
 Chet Atkins – producer
 Danny Davis – producer 
 Roy Shockley – engineering
 Don Tweedy – arrangement, conductor

Release history

References

1969 albums
Albums produced by Chet Atkins
Albums produced by Danny Davis (country musician)
Dottie West albums
Eddy Arnold tribute albums
RCA Records albums